Pay or Die is a 1960 American biographical and crime film directed by Richard Wilson and starring Ernest Borgnine, Zohra Lampert, Howard Caine, Alan Austin, and Robert F. Simon.

The film is a dramatization of the career of New York City police officer Joseph Petrosino, a pioneer in the fight against organized crime in America. The film deals primarily with Petrosino and his Italian Squad's opposition to the extortion rackets of the Black Hand in lower Manhattan's Little Italy.

Plot
The rookie Petrosino convinces the Police Commissioner of New York City to allow him to form a special squad to combat The Black Hand on its own grounds, as success depends on the ability to speak Italian and to convince the ordinary citizens of the tenements that gangsters are not heroes to worship. Petrosino's initial opponent is Lupo Miano, a leading extorntionist. But he soon suspects it runs deeper than Lupo's obvious rackets.

Rather shy socially, Petrosino is astonished to find out that the daughter of a family he assisted, Adelina Saulino, is in love with him, and they are eventually married.

Things come to a head when the Black Hand attempts to extort money from the famous opera singer Enrico Caruso. Petrosino appoints himself the singer's personal bodyguard. After a performance one night, a Black Hand member places a bomb in Caruso's car. Only a forgotten hat saves the singer from the bomb that kills his chauffeur. As the criminal attempts to flee, Petrosino shoots and kills him.

Some time later, a jeweler receives a Black Hand note and notifies Petrosino. Unfortunately, the Black Hand learns about this and coordinates another bomb, this time hidden inside a vegetable cart. The bomb kills the jeweler and several school girls, including the child of a Black Hand member. The bomber survives, and a nun provides enough information for a facial sketch to be made. Following the evidence, Petrosino is lead to the suspected hideout of the bomber. He smuggles himself into the hideout, wrapped up in a giant bale of cotton rags. After a violent fistfight, the bomber is killed as he resists arrest.

Petrosino hits on a new tactic---travel to Italy and see if local gangsters are wanted in Italy and can be deported to face surer justice in their own country. The tactic is successful beyond his wildest dreams, but Petrosino also uncovers evidence of a burgeoning nationwide crime syndicate. A leading Little Italy citizen, Luigi Di Sarno, is a fugitive wanted in Sicily for double murder. He conveys this message back home by mail, trusting rookie cop Johnny Viscardi to carry on for him if the worst happens.

The day before Petrosino is to return to New York, he is lured to a meeting with a traitorous informant, who reveals himself to be the head of the mafia in Sicily. Petrosino leaves the meeting and is shot down in the street. Back in New York at the funeral home, Viscardi notices Di Sarno spit into Petrosino's coffin---all Viscardi needs to arrest a head of the Blackhanders.

Cast
 Ernest Borgnine as Police Lt. Joseph Petrosino
 Zohra Lampert as Adelina Saulino
 Alan Austin as Johnny Viscardi
 Renata Vanni as Mama Saulino
 Bruno Della Santina as Papa Saulino
 Robert F. Simon as Police Commissioner
 Robert Ellenstein as Luigi Di Sarno 
 Howard Caine as Enrico Caruso
 Barry Russo as Lupo Miano (as John Duke)
 Vito Scotti as Officer Simonetti
 John Marley as D. Caputo, Ragman
 Delia Nora Salvi as Miss Salvi, Di Sarno's Secretary

International titles
This film was also released under the following titles:
La mafia – France
Maksa tai kuole – Finland
Pagar o morir – Venezuela
Pagare o morire – Italy
To telesigrafo tou thanatou – Greece (transliterated ISO-LATIN-1 title)
Zahl oder stirb – West Germany

References

External links
 
 
 
 

 List of American films of 1960

1960 films
1960 crime drama films
Allied Artists films
Films about Italian-American organized crime
Films set in the 1900s
Organized crime films based on actual events
American crime drama films
Films scored by David Raksin
Films directed by Richard Wilson (director)
1960s English-language films
1960s American films